Maximilian Ernst Koch (born 8 October 1959) is a sailor from Germany, who as midperson, together with his teammates Roman Koch and Gregor Bornemann, became twice World Champion in the Soling.

Sailing life 
Koch switched, with his brother Roman Koch, after a good run in the Flying Dutchman in 1977 to the Soling. Koch as midperson won his first Soling World Championship 20–27 May 2005 of the Tyrrhenian sea in front of Castiglione della Pescaia, Italy with Roman Koch and Gregor Bornemann. The second time took place five years later 5–13 February on the Guaiba river off the coast of Porto Alegre, Brasil. After the Championship in Castellione the Koch team earned the nickname "The Maremma boys". In 2009 the Koch team took the silver at the Soling Worlds in Etobicoke, Canada.
Furthermore, Koch won two gold and five silver medals at Soling European Championships between 2003 and 2013 all as midperson and with the same team members. Koch holds many national Championships in several countries.

Maxl became “Sailor of the Year 2010” in the Yacht-Club-Berlin-Grünau

Personal life 
Koch lives in Munich and works in the insurance and art gallary branch.

References

1959 births
Living people
German male sailors (sport)
Flying Dutchman class sailors
Dragon class sailors
Sportspeople from Munich
Soling class world champions
European Champions Soling